The Luis Ernesto "Cascarita" Tapia Court or Mini Rommel as it was known, is an alternative court to Estadio Rommel Fernandez which provides training to the Panama national football team, but is also used by clubs of Panamanian Football League. It is named after the Panamanian footballer, famous in the 1960s and 1970s, called the "Central-American Pele". and is located in the Sports Complex of Ciudad Deportiva Irving Saladino.

Opening

It was officially inaugurated on January 22, 2009 by the former president Martin Torrijos, Siglo XXI and Chorrillo FC youth teams played the first match. In September 2010 was given the name of Luis Ernesto Tapia, in tribute to footballer of same name.

Name
Five names were proposed for the stadium, and Luis Ernesto Tapia, was selected by Pandeportes (Government Sports Authority), in honor of that great footballer.

Renovations
In January 2012, a roof was installed to the main section costing $302,259.

Other Usage
The field is also used by men and women Flag football leagues.

References

2009 establishments in Panama
Cancha de Entrenamiento Luis Tapia
Multi-purpose stadiums in Panama
Sports venues completed in 2009